Tedric Thompson (born January 20, 1995) is an American football safety who is a free agent. He played college football at the University of Colorado Boulder, and was drafted in the fourth round of the 2017 NFL Draft by the Seattle Seahawks.

Professional career

Seattle Seahawks
The Seattle Seahawks selected Thompson in the fourth round with the 111th overall pick in the 2017 NFL Draft. He was the 12th safety selected in 2017 and was one of three safeties drafted by the Seahawks that year. Thompson was the second safety selected by the Seahawks behind Michigan's Lano Hill, but was selected before Cincinnati's Mike Tyson.

On May 11, 2017, the Seattle Seahawks signed Thompson to a four-year, $3.07 million contract that includes a signing bonus of $672,004.

Throughout training camp, Thompson competed against Bradley McDougald to be the primary backup free safety. Head coach Pete Carroll named Thompson the third free safety on the Seahawks’ depth chart to begin the regular season, behind Earl Thomas and Bradley McDougald.

Thompson was inactive as a healthy scratch for the Seahawks’ first seven games (Weeks 1–8). On November 5, 2017, Thompson made his professional regular season debut and made one tackle during their 17–14 loss against the Washington Redskins in Week 9. He finished his rookie season in 2017 with four combined tackles (two solo) in nine games and zero starts.

In Week 5 of the 2019 season against the Los Angeles Rams, Thompson intercepted a pass from Jared Goff that was dropped by Gerald Everett in the 30–29 win.
In Week 6 against the Cleveland Browns, Thompson intercepted a pass thrown by Baker Mayfield in the 32–28 win.

On October 30, 2019, he was placed on injured reserve with a shoulder injury.

Thompson was released by the Seahawks on March 31, 2020.

Kansas City Chiefs
Thompson was signed by the Kansas City Chiefs on July 30, 2020. He was waived on November 28, 2020.

Cleveland Browns
Thompson was claimed off waivers by the Cleveland Browns on November 30, 2020. He was waived on January 15, 2021.

Denver Broncos
On July 27, 2021, Thompson signed with the Denver Broncos. On August 8, 2021, the Broncos released Thompson.

Tennessee Titans
On August 12, 2021, Thompson signed with the Tennessee Titans. He was placed on injured reserve on August 17, 2021. He was released on August 20.

Cleveland Browns (second stint)
On December 16, 2021, Thompson was signed to the Cleveland Browns practice squad. Thompson was elevated to the active roster for the December 20 game versus the Las Vegas Raiders.

Personal life
He is the younger brother of former safety Cedric Thompson.

References

External links
 
 Colorado Buffaloes bio

1995 births
Living people
American football safeties
Cleveland Browns players
Colorado Buffaloes football players
Denver Broncos players
Kansas City Chiefs players
People from Valencia, Santa Clarita, California
Seattle Seahawks players
Players of American football from Inglewood, California
Sportspeople from Santa Clarita, California
Tennessee Titans players